Sindhi Australians ( (Perso-Arabic); सिंधी आस्ट्रेलियाई (Devanagari);) are Australians that have Sindhi origins. According to the SBS Australia Census Explorer, there are an estimated 2,635 Sindhis in Australia, a 65% increase since 2016, mostly in areas like Sydney and Melbourne.

History 
Early migrations existed before the 20th century, however they were very few. In 1952, Government of Pakistan gifted Australia 10 Red Sindhi bulls.

Further reading 
 Jhulelal, Gorakhnath and the Hindu Sindhi Diaspora, Anita Ray C. (2011). Journal of Oriental Society Australia
 Transnational Spaces of India and Australia, Paul Sharrad, D. N. Bandyopadhyay (2022) p. 151,

References

External links 
 Sydney Sindhi Association
 Sindhi Sangat Australia
 SBS Australia Census Sindhi Language
 Sindhi Foundation

Sindhi people
Sindhi diaspora
Indian diaspora in Australia
Pakistani diaspora in Australia
Indian Australians